Braunsapis is a genus of bees in the tribe Allodapini. It is the largest genus of the tribe and is known for its array of social behaviors. The genus is distributed in Africa, Asia, and Australasia.

Most of these bees are slender in shape and black in color, though some are paler or have red coloration.

Like other allodapines, bees of this genus raise young in a nest burrow. Burrows are dug in plants, such as African blue basil (Ocimum kilimandscharicum) and lantana (Lantana camara).

Species include:

Braunsapis acuticauda
Braunsapis affinissima
Braunsapis albipennis
Braunsapis albitarsis
Braunsapis albolineata
Braunsapis alqarnii
Braunsapis angolensis
Braunsapis antandroy
Braunsapis anthracina	 
Braunsapis apicalis
Braunsapis associata
Braunsapis aurantipes
Braunsapis aureoscopa
Braunsapis biroi
Braunsapis bislensis
Braunsapis boharti
Braunsapis bouyssoui
Braunsapis breviceps
Braunsapis calidula
Braunsapis clarihirta
Braunsapis clarissima
Braunsapis cupulifera
Braunsapis debilis
Braunsapis diminuta
Braunsapis diminutoides
Braunsapis dolichocephala
Braunsapis draconis
Braunsapis elizabethana
Braunsapis eximia	 
Braunsapis flaviventris
Braunsapis facialis
Braunsapis flavitarsis
Braunsapis foveata
Braunsapis fuscinervis
Braunsapis ghanae
Braunsapis gorillarum
Braunsapis hewitti
Braunsapis hirsuta
Braunsapis hyalina
Braunsapis indica 
Braunsapis kaliago
Braunsapis langenburgensis
Braunsapis leptozonia
Braunsapis liliputana
Braunsapis longula
Braunsapis luapulana
Braunsapis lyrata
Braunsapis maculata
Braunsapis madecassa
Braunsapis madecassella
Braunsapis maxschwarzi
Braunsapis minutula
Braunsapis natalica
Braunsapis nautica
Braunsapis neavei
Braunsapis occidentalis
Braunsapis otavica
Braunsapis palavanica 
Braunsapis pallida
Braunsapis paradoxa
Braunsapis philippinensis
Braunsapis picitarsis
Braunsapis platyura
Braunsapis plebeia	 
Braunsapis plumosa 
Braunsapis praesumptiosa
Braunsapis protuberans
Braunsapis puangensis
Braunsapis rhodesi
Braunsapis rolini
Braunsapis rubicundula
Braunsapis rugosella
Braunsapis simplicipes
Braunsapis somatotheca
Braunsapis strandi
Braunsapis stuckenbergorum
Braunsapis trochanterata
Braunsapis verticalis
Braunsapis vitrea
Braunsapis virilipicta

References

Further reading
Singh, S. S. Sundarbans buzzes with discovery of solitary bee. The Hindu 24 January 2016.

Xylocopinae